Gymnopilus subdryophilus is a species of mushroom in the family Hymenogastraceae.

See also

List of Gymnopilus species

External links
Gymnopilus subdryophilus at Index Fungorum

subdryophilus
Taxa named by William Alphonso Murrill